Natália Lage Vianna Soares (born 30 October 1978) is a Brazilian actress and television presenter.

Career 

At the age of four years, Natália Lage appeared in several commercials.

Natalia Lage has acted in telenovelas since the age of eleven - when she premiered in O Salvador da Pátria. She starred in the telenovela O Amor Está no Ar in 1997. This was followed by appearances in A Padroeira, Kubanacan and Da Cor do Pecado.

In the theater, she staged many shows as Zastrozzi, assembly Selton Mello and Daniel Herz text to Canadian George Walker, Orlando with the text of Virginia Woolf toward Bia Lessa and Eu Nunca Disse que Prestava with a text by Adriana Falcão and Lu Pessanha, directed by Rodrigo Penna.

She appeared in the films O Homem do Ano, adaptation of José Henrique Fonseca, for The Romance O Matador, by Patrícia Melo. She also appeared in the cast of 2 Filhos de Francisco and Xuxa e o Tesouro da Cidade Perdida.

When the show was Theatre Quando Se é Alguém based on the text by Luigi Pirandello (1867–1936) translated by the director and researcher Martha Ribeiro. In 2010, the cast of the film Como Esquecer playing Lisa, that same year she was in the theater with the play Comédia Russa, written by Pedro Brício and Directed by João Fonseca.

Natália was part of the cast of the sitcom A Grande Família, in 2011 she leaves the cast of the show. Currently part of the cast of the show Tapas & Beijos, playing dancer Lucilene.

In 2013, the comedy is Vai que Dá Certo, who has the cast Gregório Duvivier, Bruno Mazzeo, Fábio Porchat, Danton Mello, among others.

Personal life 
Lage began dating the screenwriter Rodrigo Lages in 2006, marrying him in 2013. The two separated in 2018.

Filmography

Television

Film

Theater
 1991 - Procura-se um Amigo
 1992 - Namoro
 1993 - Os Sete Gatinhos
 1995 - Bonitinha mas Ordinária
 1995 - Arthur Bispo de Rosário/A Via Sacra dos Contrários
 1996 - No de Gravata
 1997 - A Beira do Mar Aberto
 2001 - Pinóquio
 2003 - Zastrozzi
 2004 - Esse Alguém Maravilhoso que Eu amei
 2005 - Orlando
 2006 - Do Outro lado da Tarde
 2006 - Eu Nunca disse que Prestava
 2009 - Quando se é Alguém
 2010 - Comédia Russa
 2011 - Trilhas Sonoras de Amor Perdidas
 2012 - JT – Um Conto de Fadas Punk
 2013 - Edukators
 2016 - Jacqueline

References

External links 

 

1978 births
Living people
People from Niterói
Brazilian television actresses
Brazilian telenovela actresses
Brazilian film actresses
Brazilian stage actresses